Louis-Georges Desjardins (May 12, 1849 – June 8, 1928) was a Canadian journalist and politician.

Born in Saint-Jean-Port-Joli, Canada East, the son of François Roy dit Desjardins and Clarisse Miville dit Deschênes, Desjardins was educated at the Collège de Lévis and at the Military College. A journalist, he was the editor-in-chief of newspaper Le Canadien from 1875 to 1880.

He was elected to the Legislative Assembly of Quebec for the electoral district of Montmorency in the 1881 election. A Conservative, he was re-elected in 1886 and was defeated in 1890. He was elected to the House of Commons of Canada for the electoral district of Montmorency in an 1890 by-election. A Conservative, he was re-elected in the 1891 election for the electoral district of L'Islet. He resigned in 1892 when he was appointed Clerk of the Legislative Assembly of Quebec, a position which he held until 1912.

He was also a Lieutenant-Colonel of the 17th Levis Battalion, Volunteer Militia.

After his death in 1928, he was entombed at the Notre Dame des Neiges Cemetery in Montreal.

Bibliography

Précis historique du 17e bataillon d'infanterie de Lévis depuis sa formation en 1862 jusqu'à 1872, suivi des ordres permanents du même corps (1872)
M. Laurier devant l'histoire : les erreurs de son discours et les véritables principes du Parti conservateur (1877)
De l'idée conservatrice dans l'ordre politique (1879)
Considérations sur l'annexion (1891)
A True and Sound Policy of Equal Rights for All. Open Letters to Dalton McCarthy (1893)
Decisions of the Speakers of the House of Commons of Canada, 1867-1900 (1901)
Décisions des orateurs de l'Assemblée législative de la province de Québec 1867-1901 (1902)
l'Angleterre, le Canada et la Grande Guerre (1917)
l'Harmonie dans l'union (1919)

References

External links
 
 
 

1849 births
1928 deaths
Conservative Party of Canada (1867–1942) MPs
Members of the House of Commons of Canada from Quebec
Conservative Party of Quebec MNAs
Journalists from Quebec
Burials at Notre Dame des Neiges Cemetery